Matthew Laurance (born Matthew Dycoff) is an American film and television actor best known for starring as Ben Coleman in the Fox  sitcom Duet and for his recurring role as Mel Silver on Beverly Hills, 90210.

Early life, family and education
Matthew Dycoff was born in Queens, New York City, New York and raised in Hewlett, New York. He has an identical twin brother, Mitchell (born four minutes earlier), who is also a professional actor.

Both brothers are graduates of Tufts University.

Career
Laurance appeared on Saturday Night Live during its sixth season. He left SNL after one season (albeit a short season, only 13 episodes).

Laurance portrayed bass player Sal Amato in the 1983 cult hit Eddie and the Cruisers, and he was the only cast member besides Michael Paré and Michael Antunes to appear in the 1989 sequel, Eddie and the Cruisers II: Eddie Lives! He also had a role in Streets of Fire, as one of the two Ardmore police officers who enter the bus Tom Cody (Michael Paré) was on, making this the third film he appeared in with Paré.

He starred as detective novelist Ben Coleman in the sitcom Duet on Fox, which ran from 1987 to 1989 for three seasons, at the time, one of few original programs during the Fox network's debut. He also appeared on television in thirtysomething.

From 1991 through 2000, he performed the recurring role of Mel Silver, father of David Silver and Erin Silver on Beverly Hills, 90210.

References

External links
 

Living people
American male film actors
American male television actors
1950 births
American sketch comedians
People from Queens, New York
Comedians from New York (state)
20th-century American male actors
20th-century American comedians
Male actors from New York City
Identical twin male actors
American twins
Tufts University alumni
People from Jewell County, Kansas
People from Hewlett, New York